Zwiebelkuchen is a savory German onion cake made of steamed onions, diced bacon, cream, and caraway seeds on either a yeast or leavened dough.

See also
 Flammkuchen Similar Alsatian and South-Western German dish
 List of onion dishes

References

External links
 Recipe for a Mainzer Zwiebelkuchen (German) 
 Recipe for a Quiche-like Zwiebelkuchen (German)
 

German cakes
Swiss cuisine
Onion-based foods